Newbarn is a hamlet around a crossroads northwest of Etchinghill in Kent, England. Etchinghill Golf Club is on the road between the two. Tolsford Hill BT Tower can clearly be seen on Tolsford Hill to the south. It is in the civil parish of Postling.

References

Hamlets in Kent